McIlrath is a surname. Notable people with the surname include:

Dylan McIlrath (born 1992), Canadian ice hockey player
Patricia McIlrath (1917–1999), American educator and theatre director
Tim McIlrath (born 1978), American punk rock musician

See also
McGrath